A European Research Infrastructure Consortium (ERIC) is a full juridical person and a corporation under European Union law. With a membership of at least one European Union member state and two EU member or associated states, it has legal personality and full legal capacity recognized in all Member States.
Currently there are 25 ERICs established.

In order to promote innovation and knowledge and technology transfer, the ERIC should be allowed to carry out some limited economic activities if they are closely related to its principal task and they do not jeopardize its achievement.

Membership
The members of an ERIC may be Member States, associated countries, third countries other than associated countries and intergovernmental organizations. Further Member or Associated states, third countries or intergovernmental organisations may become members or observers without voting rights.

Aware of the constant enlargement of the community, the existing ERICs formed in 2017 the ERIC Forum in order to further strengthen the coordination among ERICs and interact effectively with the EC to achieve the full implementation of the ERIC regulation.

Services

ERIC is a meeting point for scientists and researchers across Europe. ERIC consortium is an interchange of knowledge and publications; a hub of the scientific results achieved; a scientific infrastructure shared across national states with resources and technology. The ERIC consortium provides a network of relations between scientists from various countries, and between scientists and industries in the field of research. In this context, a high-level school funded directly by the European Commission has been set up to train new generations of European Researchers to lead Research Infrastructures and to create a single European scientific community.

Legal framework
The Community legal framework for a European Research Infrastructure Consortium (ERIC) entered into force on 28 August 2009, with the Council Regulation (EC) n. 723/2009. This specific legal form is designed to facilitate the joint establishment and operation of Research Infrastructures of European interest.

External links
EC website
ERIC Forum

List of ERICs in chronological order

2011
SHARE ERIC - Survey of Health, Ageing and Retirement in Europe

2012
CLARIN ERIC - Common Language Resources and Technology Infrastructure

2013
EATRIS ERIC - European Advanced Translational Research Infrastructure in Medicine
ESS ERIC - European Social Survey
BBMRI ERIC - Biobanking and Biomolecular Resources Research Infrastructure
ECRIN ERIC - European Clinical Research Infrastructures Network

2014
EURO-ARGO ERIC - European Contribution to the Argo Programme (Global Ocean Monitoring System)
CERIC ERIC - Central European Research Infrastructure Consortium
DARIAH ERIC - Digital Research Infrastructure for the Arts and Humanities
JIV ERIC - Joint Institute for VLBI (Very Long Baseline Interferometry)

2015
EUROPEAN SPALLATION SOURCE ERIC - European Spallation Source
ICOS ERIC - Integrated Carbon Observation System

2016
EMSO ERIC - European Multidisciplinary Seafloor and Water Column Observatory

2017
LIFEWATCH ERIC - e-Science and Technology European Infrastructure for Biodiversity and Ecosystem Research
CESSDA ERIC - Consortium of European Social Science Data Archives
ECCSEL ERIC - European Carbon Dioxide Capture and Storage Laboratory
INSTRUCT ERIC - Integrated Structural Biology Research Infrastructure

2018
EMBRC ERIC - European Marine Biological Resource Centre
EU-OPENSCREEN ERIC - European Infrastructure of Open Screening Platforms for Chemical Biology
EPOS ERIC - European Plate Observing System

2019
 EURO-BIOIMAGING ERIC - European Research Infrastructure for Imaging Technologies in Biological and Biomedical Sciences

2021
 ELI ERIC - Extreme Light Infrastructure
2022

 ANAEE ERIC - Analysis and Experimentation on Ecosystems
 MIRRI ERIC - The Microbial Resource Research Infrastructure
 EU-SOLARIS ERIC - European SOLAR Research Infrastructure for Concentrated Solar Power

References

College and university associations and consortia in Europe
European research networks
European Union technology policy